"Tranquila" is a song by Colombian singer J Balvin, and included in his first album La Familia (2013). It was released as the second single from the album on October 15, 2012.

Track listing 
Digital download
"Tranquila" – 3:19

Digital download
"Tranquila (feat. Eleni Foureira)" – 4:05

Eleni Foureira version 
In June 2014, J Balvin performed the song at the 2014 MAD Video Music Awards with Greek singer Eleni Foureira. This version was released as a single on August 5, 2014. It is featured on Foureira's third studio album Anemos Agapis (2014).

Charts

The song had great repercussions in Greece, Bulgaria, Romania and Turkey. The song reached number one on Turkey's biggest music channel Number 1. The song entered the top 5 in Austria. It also managed to enter the top 10 in countries such as Albania, Sweden, Russia, Ukraine, Serbia and Hungary. This song was Balvin's first international hit after Yo Te Lo Dije

Certifications

References

2012 songs
2012 singles
2013 singles
J Balvin songs
Songs written by J Balvin
Spanish-language songs
Capitol Latin singles
Number-one singles in Greece